Uza may refer to:
Places
Uza, Landes, a village in the department of Landes in France
Uza, Israel, a moshav in Israel
Horvat Uza (Uza ruins), archaeological site in the Negev desert, Israel
Horbat 'Uza (Uza ruins), archaeological site east of Acre in northwestern Israel

Other uses
"Uza" (song), a 2012 song by AKB48

UzA may refer to:
 Uzbekistan National News Agency

UZA may refer to:
 Abbreviation for "urbanized area" in metropolitan planning organizations
 Universitair Ziekenhuis Antwerpen, the university hospital of Antwerp University